The 1924 Campeonato de Portugal Final was the final match of the 1923–24 Campeonato de Portugal, the 3rd season of the Portuguese football cup, organised by the Portuguese Football Union.

The match took place on Sunday, 8 June 1924, at the Estádio do Campo Grande in Lisbon, between Algarve side Olhanense and Porto side FC Porto. Olhanense won the match 4–2, with goals from Graça, Tamanqueiro, Gralho and Belo. In doing so, Olhanense conquered their 1st title in the competition.

The President of Portugal, Manuel Teixeira Gomes attended the game, starting a tradition in Portugal.

Road to the final

Note: In all results below, the score of the finalist is given first (H: home; A: away; N: neutral).

Match

Details

References

1924
1924 in association football
FC Porto matches
S.C. Olhanense
1923–24 in Portuguese football